Anđelo Milevoj (born 26 March 1941) is a Croatian retired football player. He was named Best Defender of the Yugoslav First League for two years in a row, in 1967 and 1968.

Club career
Born in Labin, as a player, he was widely regarded as one of HNK Rijeka's best defenders of all time. He spent seven years in Rijeka, collecting 200 caps. He also spent two years with Olimpija Ljubljana.

International career
He has made four appearances for the Yugoslav national team (against the USSR, Bulgaria, Czechoslovakia and Israel), all friendlies in 1966.

Honours
HNK Rijeka
Yugoslav Second League: 1969–70
Yugoslav First League 4th place: 1964–65
Yugoslav First League 4th place: 1965–66
Olimpija Ljubljana
Yugoslav Cup runner-up: 1970

Individual
Best Defender of the Yugoslav First League: 1967, 1968
NK Rijeka all time XI

Career statistics

Club

References

External links
 

1941 births
Living people
People from Labin
Association football defenders
Yugoslav footballers
Yugoslavia international footballers
NK Rudar Labin players
HNK Rijeka players
NK Olimpija Ljubljana (1945–2005) players
Yugoslav First League players